Mohd Lot Abu Hassan (born 23 June 1984) is a Malaysian footballer who plays for Ultimate F.C. as a midfielder.

References

External links
 

1984 births
Living people
Malaysian footballers
PKNS F.C. players
Felda United F.C. players
Sarawak FA players
PDRM FA players
Malaysia Super League players
Association football midfielders